Vines Botanical Gardens (25 acres) are botanical gardens located at 3500 Oak Grove Road, Loganville, Georgia, United States. They are open daily; no admission fee is charged.

The themed gardens include annuals, perennials, display garden, water garden, garden railroad, and a rose garden, as well as an arboretum, Swan Lake (3.5 acres), Koi pond, fountains and the Manor House. The property also contains a restaurant, and special events rooms.

See also 
 List of botanical gardens in the United States

External links
Garden Web

Botanical gardens in Georgia (U.S. state)
Protected areas of Walton County, Georgia